Karaka Bays is a suburb of Wellington, New Zealand. It lies on the northeast coast of the Miramar Peninsula, 6 km east-south-east of the city centre, and has an expansive view of Wellington Harbour. It takes its name from a New Zealand native tree, the karaka or New Zealand laurel.

The suburb consists of residential properties close to the shores of two bays, Scorching Bay in the north and Karaka Bay in the south. Nearby suburbs are Miramar and Maupuia. Prominent features of Karaka Bays include the Scorching Bay Domain, a recreational park at the northern end of the suburb. The Cook Strait ferry passes the coast of Karaka Bay on its way between Picton and Wellington.

The area was historically connected with whaling - Coombe Rocks, a series of rocky islets off the coast, were used as a watching-place for cetaceans. In recent years marine mammals have returned to the area, with seals commonly sighted along the coast and orca occasionally visible offshore.

Demographics 

Karaka Bay-Worser Bay had a population of 1,503 at the 2018 New Zealand census, an increase of 60 people (4.2%) since the 2013 census, and an increase of 84 people (5.9%) since the 2006 census. There were 594 households. There were 747 males and 756 females, giving a sex ratio of 0.99 males per female. The median age was 44.8 years (compared with 37.4 years nationally), with 273 people (18.2%) aged under 15 years, 207 (13.8%) aged 15 to 29, 777 (51.7%) aged 30 to 64, and 243 (16.2%) aged 65 or older.

Ethnicities were 91.0% European/Pākehā, 6.0% Māori, 2.0% Pacific peoples, 7.2% Asian, and 2.6% other ethnicities (totals add to more than 100% since people could identify with multiple ethnicities).

The proportion of people born overseas was 31.3%, compared with 27.1% nationally.

Although some people objected to giving their religion, 59.7% had no religion, 30.3% were Christian, 1.2% were Hindu, 0.2% were Muslim, 1.2% were Buddhist and 2.0% had other religions.

Of those at least 15 years old, 645 (52.4%) people had a bachelor's or higher degree, and 78 (6.3%) people had no formal qualifications. The median income was $60,300, compared with $31,800 nationally. The employment status of those at least 15 was that 669 (54.4%) people were employed full-time, 183 (14.9%) were part-time, and 45 (3.7%) were unemployed.

References

Suburbs of Wellington City
Populated places around the Wellington Harbour